Gille Chlerig,1 also Gillocheri 2 or Gillocher, Gillocher or Gylocher is a Gaelic name attested only in a Latin source, a 13th-century forgery designed to advance the cause of Scottish independence. The name is highly corrupted, and therefore the name and meaning is unclear. Gille Chlerig is not known in any capacity other than being father of Morggán, but most scholars seem to be comfortable accepting him as the Mormaer or Earl of Mar who preceded his son Morggán.

References
 Anderson, Early Sources, Vol. II, p. 494 in n.1 of 493
 Oram, "The Earls and Earldom of Mar", p. 47

Bibliography
 Anderson, Alan Orr, Early Sources of Scottish History: AD 500-1286, 2 Vols (Edinburgh, 1922)
 Richard D. Oram, "The Earls and Earldom of Mar, c1150-1300," Steve Boardman and Alasdair Ross (eds.) The Exercise of Power in Medieval Scotland, c.1200-1500, (Dublin/Portland, 2003).  pp. 46–66
 Roberts, John L., Lost Kingdoms: Celtic Scotland in the Middle Ages, (Edinburgh, 1997), pp. 55–6

1140s deaths
People from Aberdeenshire
Year of birth unknown
Year of death uncertain
Mormaers of Mar
12th-century mormaers